The United States Air Force's 269th Combat Communications Squadron is an Ohio Air National Guard combat communications unit located at Springfield Air National Guard Base, Ohio.

Mission
The dual mission of the 269th Combat Communications Squadron is to rapidly deploy an integrated force capable of establishing initial and build-up Command and Control (C2); Communications; and Information Operations (IO) capabilities to support the war fighter during times of war and Federal/State agencies during Homeland Emergencies.

History

USAAC/WWII
The 269th Combat Communications Squadron is the oldest combat communications squadron in the Air Force and was formed three months after the attack on Pearl Harbor and the subsequent United States entry into World War II. It became the 77th Signal Platoon (Aviation), an Army communications element at Davis Monthan Field, Tucson, Arizona, with a complement of one person, a Private Bunn, who later became First Sergeant. The unit had an authorized strength of approximately two hundred personnel with all the tools and equipment essential to provide communications for a typical fighter or bomber unit headquarters and its detachments. The company trained at three stateside bases, Gowen Field, Idaho; Wendover Field, Utah; and Rapid City Army Air Base, South Dakota, before transferring to England in June 1943. They were renamed the 1077th Signal Company, Service Group and were assigned to Camp Cheddington, England. The 8th Air Force Composite Command was the first of a series of fighter and bomber units served by the company in England and Northern Ireland. Moving to Belgium with 1st Bombardment Division and the VIII AF Fighter Command in February 1945, the company was based at Charleroi, Belgium. From there they dispatched personnel to install and operate beacons and communications systems across the expanding front in France, Belgium, Luxembourg, the Netherlands, and Germany. They moved forward with the fliers and even participated in an infantry attack at Frislar.

Post-WWII
Returning to England in May 1945, the organization was assigned as a demobilization unit until its own inactivation, 4 December 1945. The 1077th was reconstituted as the 605th Signal Light Construction Company of the Ohio National Guard on 24 May 1946. However, sufficient people to achieve federal recognition were not assembled at its new home at the state Armory on East Mulberry Street in Springfield until 29 January 1948. Three officers and fifteen men were assigned to the new company. The mission and name changed, concurrent with the construction of a new facility at Springfield Municipal Airport. The buildings were located across the road from the bustling airport on land which became the home of a much larger unit, the 178th Fighter Group. The 605th was renamed the 269th Communications Squadron Operations, effective 1 July 1952. In October 1952, it was assigned to the newly formed 251st Communications Group.

Lineage
 Constituted as the 77th Signal Platoon (Air Base) on 24 February 1942
 Activated c. March 1942
 Redesignated 77th Signal Company, Service Group	in July 1942
 Redesignated 1077th Signal Company, Service Gp, c. June 1943
 Inactivated on 4 December 1945
 Allotted to the National Guard on 24 May 1946 and redesignated 105 Signal Light Construction Company
 Redesignation revoked and renumbered 605th Signal Light Construction Company
 Activated on 2 December 1947
 Federally recognized on 29 January 48
 Redesignated 269th Communications Squadron, Operations on 1 July 1952
 Redesignated 269th Communications Squadron, Relay Center on 29 August 1961
 Redesignated 269th Communications Squadron, Radio Relay in 1965
 Redesignated 269th Communications Squadron, Relay Center in 1967
 Redesignated 269th Mobile Communications Squadron (AFCCP) on 16 March 1968
 Reesignated 269th Mobile Communications Squadron (AFCH)
 Redesignated 269th Combat Communications Flight (AFCH) on 1 April 1976
 Redesignated 269th Combat Communications Squadron on 1 March 1982
 Redesignated 269th Combat Information Systems Squadron on 1 July 1984
 Redesignated 269th Combat Communications Squadron on 1 October 1986

Assignments
 Unknown Air Base Group (later Service Group c. March 1942
 VIII Air Force Composite Command c. 1943
 1st Bombardment Division
 VIII Fighter Command, to 4 December 1945
 55th Fighter Wing, 2 Dec 47
 Ohio Air National Guard, c. 25 October 1950 (attached to 121st Fighter Wing)
 155th Aircraft Control and Warning Group, in May 1951
 Ohio Air National Guard 1 July 52-1961
 251st Cyberspace Engineering Installation Group (later 251st Mobile Communications Group, 251 Combat Information Systems Group, 251st Combat Communications Group, October 1952 – present

Gaining Command
 Tactical Air Command, 1952
 Air Force Communications Service, (later Air Force Communications Command, Air Force Information Systems Command, Air Force Communications Command), 16 March 1968
 Air Combat Command, 1 June 1992
 Air Force Space Command, 2010 – present

Stations
 Davis-Monthan Field, Arizona, c. March 42
 Gowen Field, Idaho
 Wendover Army Air Field, Utah
 Rapid City Army Air Field, South Dakota
 New York Port of Embarkation, June 1943–June 1943
 RAF Harrington, England
 Charleroi, France, February 1945
 England May 1945 – 4 December 1945
 Springfield State Armory, Ohio, 2 December 1947
 Springfield Air National Guard Base, Ohio, 1 July 1952 – present

Commanders
Lt Col Brian S. Marshall (7 Nov 2021 - Present)
Lt Col Samantha J. Adducchio (3 June 2017 – 7 Nov 2021)
Lt Col Bonnie L. Gamary (Feb 2017 – 3 June 2017)
Lt Col Samantha J. Adducchio (Aug 2016 – Feb 2017)
Lt Col Bonnie L. Gamary (1 April 2012 – Aug 2016)
Lt Col William G. Robertson (28 Jan 2008 – 1 April 2012)
Lt. Col John S. Hennessee (19 Sep 2006 – 27 Jan 2008)
Maj William G. Robertson (1 Jun 2006 – 18 Sep 2006)
Capt Steven C. Dudash (26 Jan 2006 – 31 May 2006)
Lt Col Mark L Stout (31 Mar 1992 – 25 Jan 2006)
Bobby L. Reed (19 May 1991 ‐ 30 Mar 1992)
William R. Reilly (12 Dec 1987 – 18 May 1991)
Henry S. Youd (13 Apr 1987 – 12 Dec 1987)
James B. Wiley (10 Jul 1984 – 12 Apr 1987)<
Robert E. Canter (10 Apr 1983 – 9 Jul 1984)
William R. Soeller (1 Dec 1973 – 9 Apr 1983)
Joseph A. McGuire (11 Jan 1972 – 30 Nov 1973)
Richard E. Bennett (1 Apr 1968 – 10 Jan 1972)
Herbert E. Moore (1 Jan 1965 – 31 Mar 1968)
Clarence M. Flatter (23 Oct 1961 – 31 Dec 1964)
Stanley T. Carter (17 Jan 1961 – 22 Oct 1961)
Herbert E. Moore (17 Oct 1960 – 16 Jan 1961)
David J. Rothery (6 Aug 1957 – 16 Oct 1960)
Oris O. Trinkle (1 Apr 1955 – 5 Aug 1957)
Davis E. Dean (12 Nov 1952 – 31 Mar 1955)
Ramie E. Adams Jr. (1 May 1951 – 14 Nov 1952)
Charles R. Stahl (18 Mar 1948 – 30 Apr 1951)
William H. Brelsford (28 Jan 1948 – 17 Mar 1948)

Awards

See also
251st Combat Communications Group
Ohio Air National Guard

References

External links
178th Fighter Wing Public Affairs:"Springfield cleans up at Ohio ANG State Award Banquet", 3 Jun 2009
Dayton Daily News:"In his final year in Congress, Hobson gets a few last earmarks for the state", 25 Jun 2008
Dayton Business Journal:"President's budget includes $48M for Wright-Patterson Air Force Base", 7 May 2009
United States Senate:"Brown, Voinovich Announce Senate Appropriations Committee Approval of $1,100,000 for Combat Communications Training Complex at Springfield-Beckly Air National Guard Base", 31 Jul 2008
Ohio National Guard Public Affairs:"The American Cultural Awareness Team and Guard Recruiting Assistance Program Work Together in Community", 15 Sep 2006

Combat Communications 0269
Combat Communications 0269
Military units and formations in Ohio